Ruben Charles Laurier (December 26, 1868 – September 26, 1947) was a physician and political figure in Quebec. He represented L'Assomption in the House of Commons of Canada from 1906 to 1908 as a Liberal.

He was born in Lachenaie, Quebec, the son of Jules Laurier and Rosalie Rochon, and was educated at the Collège de l'Assomption and the Université Laval. In 1895, he married Marie Louise. Laurier was elected to the House of Commons in a 1906 by-election held after the death of Romuald-Charlemagne Laurier. In 1925, he ran unsuccessfully as a Liberal Protectionist in the federal riding of St. James. Laurier died in Montreal at the age of 78.

References

Members of the House of Commons of Canada from Quebec
Liberal Party of Canada MPs
1868 births
1947 deaths
People from Terrebonne, Quebec